The Italian Reformist Socialist Party (PSRI) was a social-democratic political party in Italy.

History
It was formed in 1912 by those leading reformist socialists who had been expelled from the Italian Socialist Party because of their desire of entering in the majority supporting Prime Minister Giovanni Giolitti. Leading members of the PSRI were Leonida Bissolati, Ivanoe Bonomi, and Meuccio Ruini. In the 1913 Italian general election, the party won 2.6% of the vote and 21 seats in single-seat constituencies spread in almost all the Italian regions; some others, such as Ruini, were elected for the Italian Radical Party. In the 1919 Italian general election, they won at 1.5% of the vote and gained 15 seats under the new proportional representation system.

The party was dissolved by the Italian fascist regime on 6 November 1926, together with all opposition parties. After World War II, Bonomi and Ruini launched the Labour Democratic Party as the continuation of the PSRI and positioned it within the National Democratic Union, which comprised the Italian Liberal Party and some former Radicals.

Electoral results

Italian Parliament

References

1912 establishments in Italy
1924 disestablishments in Italy
Defunct social democratic parties in Italy
Defunct political parties in Italy
Political parties disestablished in 1924
Political parties established in 1912